Goss is a Saxon surname meaning "goose" (from Gos, a goose). Notable people with the surname include:

Alexander Goss (1814–1872),English bishop
 Andrew Goss ( Born 1958), English Automotive expert. CEO Porsche GB, Global Sales Director Jaguar Land Rover 
Antonio Goss (born 1966), American football player and coach
Belinda Goss (born 1984), Australian  cyclist
Chris Goss (born 1959), American record producer and musician
Eleanor Goss (1895–1982), American tennis player 
Ephraim Goss (1806–1877), New York politician
Francis P. Goss (1879–1973), Washington politician
Fred Goss (born 1961), American television actor and director
Freddie Goss, American basketball player and coach
George Goss, English naval officer and football manager
Indigo Goss (born 1987), English fashion model 
James Goss (disambiguation), several people
Jeremy Goss (born 1965), Welsh international footballer
Joe Goss (1838–1885), English boxer
John Goss (1894-1953), English baritone
John Goss (composer) (1800–1880), English organist and composer
John Goss (racing driver) (born 1943), Australian racing driver
Kelli Goss (born 1992), American film and television actress
Kennedy Goss (born 1996), Canadian swimmer
Kieran Goss (born 1962), Northern Irish contemporary singer-songwriter
Kimberly Goss (born 1978), Korean-American singer 
Luke Goss (born 1968), English actor and drummer
Linda Goss, American storyteller
Linda Goss, Royal Ballet teacher
Matt Goss (born 1968), English singer-songwriter and musician
Matthew Goss (born 1986), Australian cyclist 
Norm Goss Jr. (born 1951), former Australian rules footballer
Norm Goss Sr. (1915–1983), former Australian rules footballer
Norman P. Goss (1906–1977), American inventor and researcher
Olga May Goss (1916–1994), Australian plant pathologist
Pat Goss, American automotive expert and radio/television personality
Pearl Goss, Indian badminton player
Pete Goss (born 1960s), British yachtsman
Porter Goss (born 1938), American politician
Rebecca Goss (poet) (born 1974), English poet 
Rebecca Goss (chemist) (born 1976), British Bioorganic chemist/chemical biologist
Richard Goss (Irish republican), (1915-1941), executed Irish Republican 
Sandy Goss (born 1968), Canadian swimmer
Sarah Goss (born 1992), New Zealand rugby union player
Sean Goss (born 1995), German-English footballer
Stephen Goss (born 1964), Welsh composer and guitarist
Stephen S. Goss (1961-2019), American judge
Steve Goss (1949-2015), American politician and reverend 
Theodora Goss (born 1968), American writer
Tim Goss (born 1963), British motor racing engineer
Tom Goss (disambiguation), several people
Wayne Goss (1951–2014), Australian politician and former Queensland Premier
William Henry Goss (1833–1906), English porcelain manufacturer
Woody Goss, American musician
Zoe Goss (born 1968), Australian cricketer

Characters
Ian Goss, from Blue Heelers

See also
 Gosse